Racking is the process of siphoning wine or beer off lees into a new, clean barrel.

Racking may also refer to:

 Racking (graffiti), the stealing of graffiti supplies
 Racking bend, a knot for joining two ropes of different diameter
 Structural racking, deforming under shear stress
 Racking, in horseriding, a type of ambling gait
 The act of moving a pistol slide to make the weapon ready to fire

See also
 Rack (disambiguation)